In organic and organometallic chemistry, an organyl group is an organic substituent with one (sometimes more) free valence(-s) at a carbon atom. The term is often used in chemical patent literature to protect claims over a broad scope.

Examples
 Acetonyl group
 Acyl group (e.g. acetyl group, benzoyl group) 
 Alkyl group (e.g., methyl group, ethyl group) 
 Alkenyl group (e.g., vinyl group, allyl group) 
 Alkynyl group (propargyl group)
 Benzyloxycarbonyl group (Cbz)
 tert-butoxycarbonyl group (Boc) 
 Carboxyl group

References

Functional groups